Charles M. Dawson (8 October 1893 – 9 October 1973) was a politician from the U.S. state of Indiana. Between 1941 and 1945 he served as Lieutenant Governor of Indiana.

Life
There is not much information available about Charles Dawson. According to his great-grandson Charles McKinley Dawson III he was a farmer and he held several local offices. Later he joined the Democratic Party and in 1940 he was elected to the office of the Lieutenant Governor of Indiana. He served in this position between 13 January 1941 and 8 January 1945 when his term ended. In this function he was the deputy of governor Henry F. Schricker and he presided over the Indiana Senate.

Charles Dawson died on 9 October 1973 in Indianapolis and was buried on the Crown Hill Cemetery in that city.

Charles is the grandfather of Jinx Dawson, singer of American psychedelic rock band Coven.

Literature
The Indianapolis Star, Star Pub. Co., Indianapolis, Ind., 10. October 1973, p. 49.

External links
 The Political Graveyard
 Statement of his great-grandson at Genealogy.com.

1893 births
1973 deaths
20th-century American politicians
Lieutenant Governors of Indiana
Indiana Democrats